Moxham may refer to:

Moxham in Johnstown, Pennsylvania, see also Moxham Historic District

People
Billy Moxham (1886-1959) Australian rules footballer
George Churchill Moxham (1892-1955) Businessman and politician of British Columbia
Roy Moxham British writer
Phil Moxham, musician in the post-punk band Young Marble Giants